The Training-1 (Chinese: 训-1, Transliterated: Xun-1) training bottom mine is a training naval mine developed by Fengxi Machinery Factory in China, and was accepted into service in November 1982. The Training-1 mine could be used to train for every bottom mine in the Chinese inventory, as well as for minesweeping training. When the training is completed, a high pressure gas valve is released, and the training bottom mine would float to the surface for recovery.

References

See also
Type 500 training mine

Naval mines of the People's Republic of China
Naval mines